Zak Andrew Rudden (born 6 February 2000) is a Scottish professional footballer who plays as a striker for St Johnstone, on loan from Dundee.

Club career

Rangers
Rudden began his career with Rangers and joined the first-team for pre-season before the start of the 2018–19 season for the first time.

Loans
In August 2018, Rudden moved out on loan to Falkirk. On 15 September 2018, Rudden scored on his debut for Falkirk.

On 23 August 2019 Rudden moved on loan to EFL League Two side Plymouth Argyle. He made his debut for the club the next day, as a first half substitute in a 3–0 win over Walsall, and scored his first goal for the club in an EFL Trophy tie against Swindon Town on 8 October 2019. The loan ended in January 2020.

Partick Thistle
On 15 January 2020 Rudden signed for Partick Thistle on a two and a half year deal.

After multiple injury problems and the shutdown of football due to COVID-19, Rudden scored his first Thistle goal on 23 March 2021 in a 3–0 win at home over Cowdenbeath in the Scottish Cup.

Dundee
In January 2022 he signed a pre-contract agreement with Dundee on a three-year deal, starting in summer 2022. On 31 January 2022, Rudden joined Dundee on loan until the end of the season. He made his debut the following day as a substitute in the Dundee derby, and scored his first goal for the club four days later against Ross County.

After officially Dundee permanently the following season, Rudden scored his first goal of the season in a home league win over Arbroath.

St Johnstone (loan) 
On 31 January 2023, Rudden joined St Johnstone on loan until the end of the season. On 25 February Rudden scored his first goal for the Saintees in a draw against St Mirren.

International career
Rudden has represented Scotland at youth international levels, up to and including under-21.

Career statistics

Honours

Club

Partick Thistle
Scottish League One: 2020–21

References

2000 births
Living people
Scottish footballers
Scotland youth international footballers
Association football forwards
Rangers F.C. players
Falkirk F.C. players
Plymouth Argyle F.C. players
Scottish Professional Football League players
English Football League players
Partick Thistle F.C. players
Dundee F.C. players
Scotland under-21 international footballers

St Johnstone F.C. players